Shangfen station, is a station on Line 6 of the Shenzhen Metro. It opened on 18 August 2020.

Station layout

Exits

References

Shenzhen Metro stations
Railway stations in Guangdong
Longhua District, Shenzhen
Railway stations in China opened in 2020